José Luis Villarreal (born 17 March 1966) is an Argentine association football coach and former player. He is the new coach of the newborn Miami Beach Club de Fútbol, that will play the United Premier Soccer League. He is the former head coach of Jacksonville Armada FC of the North American Soccer League. 

Villarreal was part of the Argentina squad at the 1992 King Fahd Cup in Saudi Arabia and usually played in midfield. He has played for clubs in Argentina, Mexico, France, and Spain, spending the majority of his time with Buenos Aires club Boca Juniors and hometown Club Atlético Belgrano in Córdoba. His eye for talent has led him to the scouting and recruiting of some of South America's top football talent, namely fellow Argentine Lionel Messi.

Club career
Born in Córdoba, Córdoba Province, Villarreal began playing football with local side San Lorenzo de Las Flores at age 16. He signed with Club Atlético Belgrano where he would play two seasons before moving to Boca Juniors. He won the 1992 championship in his five-year stint with Boca Juniors. The following year he signed for Boca's arch-rivals River Plate, where he played from 1993 to 1995.

Villarreal played one season in France at Montpellier before moving to Mexican side C.F. Pachuca during the 1997 season. Reoccurring injuries forced Villarreal to return to Argentina where he played for his home side Belgrano in 1998. He played in Argentina for the remainder of his career and after a short stint at Estudiantes he returned once more before retiring with Belgrano in 2004.

International career 
Villarreal showcased some brilliant midfield work in eight different international appearances with the Argentina national team, the most successful being an International Championship at the 1992 King Fahd Cup, later to be known as the Confederations Cup. Despite an absence of contributing goals during his international career, Villarreal played an instrumental part in the defeat of Saudi Arabia in the first addition of what would become the Confederations Cup.

Coaching career
In 2012, Villarreal was brought to Chilean club Colo-Colo as part of Omar Labruna coaching staff, serving as the deputy manager and training coach for the club. In June 2014, Jacksonville Armada FC, a team in the North American Soccer League based in Jacksonville, Florida, announced it had hired Villarreal as the team's inaugural head coach. He parted ways with the club in June 2015. In October 2019 he becomes the first coach of the Miami Beach Club de Futbol, the first and only professional team of the city of Miami Beach

Recruiting
From 2005 to 2007 Villarreal worked as President of the Academy REDH (Rumbo has Excelencia y Deportiva Humana) where he and Venezuelan academy founder Guillermo Ángel Hoyos recruited top South American talent, most notably Lionel Messi. The program offered a comprehensive educational academy that accompanied advanced football training programs enabled the best South American footballers the opportunity to play in the best clubs in Europe and around the world. Along with his colleagues, Villarreal has managed to place many of the most talented students in the best Spanish, French, Greek, and Italian clubs.

Personal life
Villarreal goes by the nickname "Villa" which was chanted during his days playing at La Bombonera with Boca Juniors. He lives with his wife Elizabeth, daughter Sofia, son Lucas and dog Milo in Córdoba, Argentina.

References

External links

1966 births
Living people
Association football midfielders
Argentine footballers
Argentine expatriate footballers
Argentina international footballers
1992 King Fahd Cup players
Argentine Primera División players
Liga MX players
Ligue 1 players
Club Atlético Belgrano footballers
Boca Juniors footballers
Club Atlético River Plate footballers
Estudiantes de La Plata footballers
All Boys footballers
C.F. Pachuca players
FIFA Confederations Cup-winning players
Expatriate footballers in Mexico
Expatriate footballers in France
Footballers from Córdoba, Argentina
Jacksonville Armada FC
North American Soccer League coaches
Jacksonville Armada FC coaches
Argentine football managers